TajMo is a joint album by the American blues musicians Taj Mahal and Keb' Mo'. It was released May 5, 2017, and won the 2018 Grammy Award for Best Contemporary Blues Album. TajMo is the twenty-sixth studio album by Taj Mahal and the thirteenth by Keb' Mo'.

The pair sat in with Jon Batiste and Stay Human on The Late Show with Stephen Colbert on April 18, 2017 to promote the album. The performance featured the song "All Around The World".

Track List
A1. "Don't Leave Me Here" (Gary Nicholson, Kevin R. Moore, Taj Mahal) - 5:03
A2. "She Knows How To Rock Me" ( William Lee Perryman) -2:40 
A3. "All Around The World" (Chic StreetMan, Kevin R. Moore) - 3:22
A4. "That's Who I Am" (Al Anderson, Kevin R. Moore*, Leslie Satcher) - 4:16
A5. "Shake Me In Your Arms" (Billy Nichols) - 5:58
A6. "Waiting On The World To Change" (John Mayer) - 2:43
B1. "Ain't Nobody Talkin'" (John Lewis Parker, Kevin R. Moore) - 4:00
B2. "Diving Duck Blues" (John Estes) - 4:28
B3/ "Squeeze Box" (Pete Townshend) - 3:16
B4. "Soul" (Kevin R. Moore, Taj Mahal) - 5:58
B5. "Om Sweet Om" (John Lewis Parker, Kevin R. Moore*, Om Johari) - 3:36

Personnel
Keb' Mo' – Vocals, Electric guitar (1, 3, 4, A5, B1, B3, B4) keyboards, percussion ( tr.1, A6 ), Resonator Guitar ( tr.2, 4, B2 ), Bass ( tr. 4, A6 ), organ ( tr. 4 ), Organ [Wurlitzer] ( A4 ), slide guitar (tr. A4), ac.guitar ( A6, B1, B4 ), Guitar [Nylon String Guitar] ( B4 )  
Taj Mahal – Vocals ( tr.A1, A2,A5,A6, B1 ), Ac. guitar ( tr.A2, A4, A6, B2 ), harmonica, Resonator Guitar ( A4 ), Ukulele, Banjo ( B4 )
Phillip Moore – Bass (B4)
Thaddeus Witherspoon – Drums ( tr.1, B4 )
Billy Branch – Harmonica  ( tr.1 )
Michael Hicks – Keyboards ( tr.A1,4 ), organ ( A4,B3 ), organ, piano ( tr.3 ), organ, Wurlitzer ( B3 ), Electric Piano [Rhodes], Organ [B3] ( B4 ) 
Sam Levine – Tenor Saxophone ( tr.1 ), Sax, flute ( tr.3 ) 
Roger Bissell – Trombone ( tr.1, 3 )
Keith Everette – Trumpet ( tr.1, 3 )
Lizz Wright – Backing Vocals ( tr.4 )
Eric Ramey - Bass ( tr.A2, A5 ), Bass, Electric Piano [Electric Piano Overdub] ( B1 )
Marcus Finnie - Drums ( tr.2, A5 )
Tommy Sims - Bass ( tr.3, B3 )
Chester Thompson -  Drums ( tr.3, 4 )
Phillip Hughley - Electric Guitar ( tr.3, 4, B4 )
Colin Linden - Mandolin ( tr.A3, A4 ), guitar, mandoline ( B3 )
Quentin Ware - Trumpet [Trumpet Solo]( tr.3 ), trumpet ( A4, B1, B4 ),
Joe Walsh - El. guitar ( tr.4, B3 ), Electric Guitar, Guitar [Guitar Solo] (A5)
Lee Oskar - Harmonica [Harmonica Solo] ( tr.4 )
Phil Madeira - Keyboards, Organ ( tr.4, B1 ), organ ( A5 ), Accordion [Rhythm Accordion]( B3 )
Crystal Taliefero - Percussion ( tr.4 ), Percussion, Udu, Shaker, Rainstick, Congas (B4)
Keio Stroud - drums ( A4, B1, B3 )
Jovan Quallo - Saxophone, Tenor Saxophone, Tenor Saxophone [Tenor Saxophone Solo] (tr.A4 ), saxophone (A5), Tenor Saxophone ( B1 ), sax ( B4 )
Roland Barber - Trombone ( tr.A4, A5, B1, B4 )
Bonnie Raitt - Backing vocal ( A6 )
Jeff Taylor - Accordion [Lead Accordion] ( B3 )
Nestor Torres - Flute [Flute Solo]( B4 )
Sheila E. - Percussion, Congas, Cowbell, Shaker, Timbales, Cymbal, Shekere ( B4 )

References 

2017 albums
Blues albums by American artists
Collaborative albums
Grammy Award for Best Contemporary Blues Album
Keb' Mo' albums